This is a list of earthquakes in Japan with either a magnitude greater than or equal to 7.0 or which caused significant damage or casualties. As indicated below, magnitude is measured on the Richter magnitude scale (ML) or the moment magnitude scale (Mw), or the  surface wave magnitude scale (Ms) for very old earthquakes. The present list is not exhaustive, and furthermore reliable and precise magnitude data is scarce for earthquakes that occurred before the development of modern measuring instruments.

History
Although there is mention of an earthquake in Yamato in what is now Nara Prefecture on August 23, 416, the first earthquake to be reliably documented took place in Nara prefecture on May 28, 599 during the reign of Empress Suiko, destroying buildings throughout Yamato province. Many historical records of Japanese earthquakes exist. The Imperial Earthquake Investigation Committee was created in 1892 to conduct a systematic collation of the available historical data, published in 1899 as the Catalogue of Historical Data on Japanese Earthquakes. 

Following the 1923 Great Kantō earthquake, the Imperial Earthquake Investigation Committee was superseded by the Earthquake Research Institute in 1925. In modern times, the catalogues compiled by Tatsuo Usami are considered to provide the most authoritative source of information on historic earthquakes, with the 2003 edition detailing 486 that took place between 416 and 1888.

Earthquake measurement
In Japan, the Shindo scale is commonly used to measure earthquakes by seismic intensity instead of magnitude. This is similar to the Modified Mercalli intensity scale used in the United States or the Liedu scale used in China, meaning that the scale measures the intensity of an earthquake at a given location instead of measuring the energy an earthquake releases at its epicenter (its magnitude) as the Richter scale does. 

Unlike other seismic intensity scales, which normally have twelve levels of intensity,  as used by the Japan Meteorological Agency is a unit with ten levels, ranging from shindo zero, a very light tremor, to shindo seven, a severe earthquake. Intermediate levels for earthquakes with shindo five and six are "weak" or "strong", according to the degree of destruction they cause.  Earthquakes measured at shindo four and lower are considered to be weak to mild, while those measured at five and above can cause heavy damage to furniture, wall tiles, wooden houses, reinforced concrete buildings, roads, gas and water pipes.

Earthquakes

See also

Category: Japanese seismologists
Coordinating Committee for Earthquake Prediction
Geology of Japan
Japan Meteorological Agency
Japan Meteorological Agency seismic intensity scale
List of disasters in Japan by death toll
List of volcanoes in Japan
Nuclear power in Japan#Seismicity
Kantō earthquakes
Nankai megathrust earthquakes
Seismicity of the Sanriku coast
Tōkai earthquakes
Tōnankai earthquakes

References

Further reading

External links

Disaster Preparedness in Japan (bilingual booklet, 3-2015 PDF from Government of Japan Cabinet Office, Director General for Disaster Management)
Earthquakes in Japan Since 1900 | Tableau Public
Japanese disasters interactive map from 416 CE to 2013 (labels in Japanese)
One Week of Japanese Earthquakes | Tableau Public

Japan
Earthquakes
Tsunamis in Japan